HMS Plumpton was a  of the British Royal Navy. She served in the First World War and was of a paddle wheel design. She struggled in heavy seas. Plumpton was mined on 19 October 1918 off Ostend. The ship was beached on the Belgian coast and was broken up where she lay.

Description
The  design was developed during the First World War after the earlier success of converted paddle wheel ships. A Racecourse-class minesweeper was capable of storing  of coal to use as fuel. Racecourse-class minesweepers were armed with two 6-pounder guns and two 2-pounder guns.

Service history
Plumpton was ordered as part of the first group of Racecourse-class minesweepers in September 1915. The ship was constructed by McMillan at their shipyard in Dumbarton, Scotland with the yard number 465 and launched on 20 March 1916. In keeping with the class, the ship was named for the racecourse in Plumpton, East Sussex and construction was completed in June 1916.

The minesweeper struck a naval mine off the coast of Ostend, Belgium on 19 October 1918. Plumpton was beached on the coast to prevent the ship from sinking. Plumpton was broken up for scrap at the site where she was beached.

Citations

Sources

External links
 World Naval Ships - HMS Plumpton
 

1916 ships
World War I ships
Minesweepers of the Royal Navy